Christofer Aly Arriola Flores (born 22 November 1987) is a Honduran professional footballer.

References

External links

1987 births
Living people
Honduran footballers
People from Atlántida Department
Honduran expatriate footballers
Expatriate footballers in El Salvador
Association football forwards
Liga Nacional de Fútbol Profesional de Honduras players
Honduran Liga Nacional de Ascenso players
F.C. Motagua players
C.D. Honduras Progreso players